Operators Manual: Buzzcocks Best is a compilation album by English punk rock band Buzzcocks. It was released in 1991 by I.R.S. Records.

Critical reception
Trouser Press called the album "a concise 25-track career condensation."

Track listing
 "Orgasm Addict" (Howard Devoto, Pete Shelley) – 2:01
 "What Do I Get?" (Shelley) – 2:56
 "I Don't Mind" (Shelley) – 2:19
 "Autonomy" (Steve Diggle) – 3:50
 "Fast Cars" (Devoto, Diggle, Shelley) – 2:31
 "Get on Our Own" (Shelley) – 2:31
 "Sixteen" (Diggle) – 3:46
 "Fiction Romance" (Shelley) – 4:34
 "Love You More" (Shelley) – 1:50
 "Noise Annoys" (Shelley) – 2:52
 "Ever Fallen in Love (With Someone You Shouldn't've)" (Shelley) – 2:42
 "Operators Manual" (Shelley) – 3:34
 "Nostalgia" (Shelley) – 2:55
 "Walking Distance" (Garvey) – 2:02
 "Nothing Left" (Shelley) – 4:28
 "ESP" (Shelley) – 4:39
 "Promises" (Diggle, Shelley) – 2:36
 "Lipstick" (Diggle, Shelley) – 2:38
 "Everybody's Happy Nowadays" (Shelley)– 3:12
 "Harmony in My Head" (Diggle) – 3:09
 "You Say You Don't Love Me" (Shelley) – 2:54
 "I Don't Know What to Do with My Life" (Shelley) – 2:44
 "I Believe" (Shelley) – 7:07
 "Are Everything" (Shelley) – 3:36
 "Radio Nine" (Shelley) – 0:43

Track 24, "Are Everything", produced by Martin Hannett

Personnel
Buzzcocks
 Pete Shelley – guitar, vocals
 Steve Diggle – guitar
 Steve Garvey – bass
 John Maher – drums

References

1991 compilation albums
Buzzcocks albums
Albums produced by Martin Rushent
I.R.S. Records compilation albums